II Taso is the second album from the Finnish hard rock band Kilpi.

Track listing
 "Tie turvatkaa" – 3:52
 "Sielut iskee tulta" – 4:24
 "Varjoista valoihin" – 4:17
 "Laki (ei ole sama kaikille)" – 4:06
 "Viimeinen näytös" – 3:36
 "Sen tietää" – 5:17
 "Kenen joukoissa seisot" – 4:31
 "Eilinen" – 4:14
 "Sumun maa" – 4:38
 "Vapaana kaikesta" – 4:13
 "Matkalla (instr.)" – 5:44

2004 albums
Kilpi albums